Pierre Affre (1590-1669) was a French sculptor.

Early life
Pierre Affre was born in 1590 in Béziers, France. He moved to Toulouse, where he was mentored by Artus Legoust.

Career
Affre was a sculptor in Toulouse. He first worked with architect Claude Pacot, with whom he restored a statue of Clémence Isaure on the Capitole de Toulouse. He subsequently worked with architect Jacques Portes. Later, he worked with stone carver Jacques Mercier, followed by plasterer Jacques Mouret and joiner Jacques Blanc. He also designed two busts with goldsmiths Antoine Guillermy and Bertrand Lacère.

Personal life
Affre was married twice. He married Jeanne Alby in 1632; they had six children. In 1645, he married Isabeau Laureaux, and they had nine children.

Death
Affre died in 1669.

References

1590 births
1669 deaths
People from Béziers
Sculptors from Toulouse
17th-century French sculptors
French male sculptors